The Convention of Saint Petersburg may refer to several diplomatic agreements including

Convention of Saint Petersburg (1747), treaty between Russia, Britain and the Dutch Republic during the War of the Austrian Succession
Saint Petersburg Declaration of 1868, a convention renouncing the military use of explosive small-weapons projectiles
Anglo-Russian Convention, treaty between Britain and Russia in 1907 agreeing not to annex Afghanistan

See also 
Saint Petersburg Declaration (disambiguation)
Treaty of Saint Petersburg (disambiguation)